The third season of Cheers, an American television sitcom, originally aired on NBC in the United States between September 27, 1984, and May 9, 1985. The show was created by director James Burrows and writers Glen and Les Charles under production team Charles Burrows Charles Productions in association with Paramount Television. The third season is available on DVD in a four-disc set.

The season marks major events that affected, or could have affected, the show. Kelsey Grammer made his debut as psychiatrist Frasier Crane, intended as part of a love triangle with Sam and Diane for the season. Actresses Rhea Perlman and Shelley Long were pregnant; Perlman's pregnancy was written into her character (Carla Tortelli), while Long's was hidden to avoid effects on her character (Diane Chambers). This was the final season for Nicholas Colasanto as Coach Ernie Pantusso; Colasanto died of a heart condition (dating back to the 1970s) which worsened during production, contributing to his absence from a number of episodes before his death in February 1985.

Background 
During the preceding two years NBC had struggled to put together a successful Thursday lineup, introducing "The Best Night of Television on Television." The initial lineup included the critically acclaimed comedy Cheers and crime series Hill Street Blues. Except for Hill Street Blues, the other series received low Nielsen ratings. A number of shows, including critically panned sitcoms, were tried and replaced over the years. NBC renewed Cheers for a second season; the show's ratings improved during summer 1983, and the second season received higher ratings. Cheers won awards (including Emmys) for both seasons.

The 1984–85 Thursday lineup consisted of—in time-slot order beginning at 8 pm Eastern (7 pm Central)—a new sitcom (The Cosby Show), three renewed sitcoms (Family Ties, Cheers and Night Court) and the renewed Hill Street Blues. This lineup received high Nielsen ratings for the entire season, beating other Thursday shows from CBS and ABC.

Cast and characters
 Sam Malone (Ted Danson): Bartender, bar owner, ex-athlete
 Diane Chambers (Shelley Long): often pretentious college-student, and waitress, the moral compass of the bar
 Ernie "Coach" Pantusso (Nicholas Colasanto): Retired coach and bartender. After Colasanto's death, the absence of his character in later episodes is explained by various events.
 Carla Tortelli (Rhea Perlman): Bitter waitress, divorced mother of six and Nick's ex-wife. 
 Cliff Clavin (John Ratzenberger): unmarried, U.S. postman, and bar know-it-all
 Norm Peterson (George Wendt): Underemployed accountant who (with his wife, Vera) attempts to conceive a child
 Frasier Crane (Kelsey Grammer): Psychiatrist and Diane's significant other
Recurring throughout Seasons 3 and 4 with his appearances becoming more frequent. Grammer is finally credited in the opening credits beginning in Season 5.

After the "end" of the on-off relationship between Sam and Diane in the previous season, Sam begins drinking again and indulges in a series of affairs; Diane quits, signing herself into a mental hospital to forget Sam. She meets upper-class psychiatrist Frasier Crane, and begins dating him. Months later, Diane returns to her apartment and learns about Sam's relapse from Coach. With help from Diane, Frasier and Coach, Sam recovers. At first Diane decides not to work as a waitress again, but Coach tells her if she does not return to the bar Sam will relapse again. Coach also tells Sam that Diane will lose her mind again, and tells Frasier that if Diane and Sam are apart they would yearn for each other. As a result, Diane returns to work at the bar as a waitress. While she is dating Frasier, she and Sam flirt with each other.

Diane and Frasier decide to elope in Europe, leaving Sam heartbroken once more. One night at the bar Sam and Diane are close to making love again, but realize they are uncertain about their future together. Before Diane leaves, Sam tells her to call him if she wants to make love again. Weeks later Sam, regretting letting Diane go, takes a plane to Italy (with Cliff's help) to stop her from marrying Frasier.

Episodes

Production 

After Sam and Diane's breakup the previous season, psychiatrist Frasier Crane was introduced this season by series creators Glen and Les Charles as Diane's upper-class "romantic and intellectual ideal". Frasier was the opposite of his lower-class rival, Sam Malone; as part of a love triangle he gave "a different form to the Sam-Diane relationship", said Glen Charles. It was originally planned for Frasier to appear only in the first few episodes before being dumped by Diane, when he would disappear. John Lithgow was originally chosen by Cheers producers for the role, but he turned it down. Kelsey Grammer (who believed he had flunked his audition) was chosen for his performance with Danson, which elicited praise from show executives and led to an extended role in the series for his character. Before Cheers, Grammer appeared in the soap opera Another World and two miniseries: Kennedy and George Washington.

In late August 1984, the pregnancies of actresses Rhea Perlman and Shelley Long were announced after at least four episodes of the season were completed. Perlman's second pregnancy was incorporated into the show by having her character, Carla Tortelli, become pregnant again (with another man, not her ex-husband Nick as in the series' first season). Long's character's (Diane Chambers') unmarried pregnancy was considered, with the father of her child either Sam or Frasier. However, the producers felt that incorporating Long's pregnancy into the show would adversely impact her character and the romantic storyline. Therefore, Long's pregnancy was concealed by either putting her behind the bar or filming her above the waist; scenes with Diane and Frasier in Europe were filmed before Long's pregnancy became noticeable. In March 1985, both actresses gave birth to baby girls.

Nicholas Colasanto, who played Coach Ernie Pantusso, had heart disease since the mid-1970s exacerbated by alcoholism. After years of sobriety, during production his heart disease worsened. Castmates noticed his weight loss, although the actor kept the severity of his illness a secret. Shortly after Christmas 1984, Colasanto was admitted to a local hospital with water in his lungs. Co-star Ted Danson later said that the veteran actor had difficulty remembering his lines during production that season. After he was released from the hospital, Colasanto's doctor recommended that he not return to work. Although he appeared in the cold opening of the third-season finale ("Rescue Me"), his last full episode was "Cheerio Cheers" (filmed in late November 1984). Colasanto died of a heart attack at his home on February 12, 1985, at age 61. Instead of recasting him, Colasanto's character Coach was written out of the show the following season as deceased without explanation.

Ratings 
Cheers was scheduled on Thursdays at 9 pm Eastern (8 pm Central) against CBS's crime series Simon & Simon and ABC programming, which included the short-lived series Glitter, made-for-television and hit theatrical films such as Grease. As reported on April 25, 1985, Cheers was No. 12 (with an average 19.7 Nielsen rating) for the season, tied with ABC's Hotel.

Reception 

Despite praise for Kelsey Grammer from show executives, at the time of Cheers original run Frasier Crane was disliked for coming between Sam and Diane. A fan approached Grammer, asking "Are you that pin dick that plays Frasier?" and the show received fan mail opposing him. Mike Boone of the Montreal Gazette was unhappy with "a shrink [as becoming another regular] hanging out in a bar, annoying decent drinking folk". Gail Shister of Knight-Ridder Newspapers called Frasier a "creepy boyfriend".

In a 1985 survey of 36 critics for United States newspapers, Cheers was ranked the second "Best Regular Series" (tying with the NBC crime series Hill Street Blues). Mike Duffy of Knight News Service called it the "best comedy series on television...about [a] family of circumstance" since The Mary Tyler Moore Show and Taxi, and the characters  "a family whose common bond is hanging out at a bar where everybody knows your name".

Later reviews were also positive, especially when its DVD was released in 2004. Nate Meyers of digitallyObsessed!com gave the season an "A" and called it well-aged and "nearly flawless". However, Meyers found Coach's disappearances in the final eight "somewhat awkward" episodes poorly handled. He pointed out that Coach was not mentioned in those episodes, and found the explanations of his disappearances not "natural". Nevertheless, Meyers praised the season's writing, James Burrows's directing (especially for "[fooling] the audience into believing a dream sequence" in season finale "Rescue Me"), the season's humor as "character and situation driven" (although "[a] few jokes are dated") and its ability to focus less on humor and more on "genuine character moments" as "refreshing" compared to other situation comedies of the time.

Adam Arseneau of DVD Verdict gave the storylines (including those featuring Norm and Cliff) 89 percent and the acting 94 percent. However, Arseneau found this season neither the best nor the worst of the series. Although Frasier was created to come between Sam and Diane, Arseneau praised the addition of the new character but criticized the love-triangle storyline as "disappointing". Like Meyers, Arseneau disliked the handling of Coach's "absence" for dishonoring the memory of Nicholas Colasanto and "[robbing] fans [of] their opportunity to properly and respectfully mourn his passing."

Jeffrey Robinson of DVD Talk rated this season four out of five stars and found its DVD release highly rewatchable. Robinson said that the plots were uncomplicated, praised the acting and writing of this season as "superb" and liked the introduction of Frasier Crane. Because of Colasanto's death, he called this season the final one for the original "wonderful" ensemble cast, finding the mixing of different characters in later seasons less accomplished.

Cliff Wheatley of IGN called one of the episodes "The Heart Is a Lonely Snipe Hunter" the tenth best Cheers episode, despite not being "the funniest episode by a long shot" but "a little mean spirited."

Accolades 
The series won three honors in April 1985 from Viewers for Quality Television, which began that year. Shelley Long was the Best Lead Actress (Comedy), Rhea Perlman the Best Supporting Actress (Comedy) and Nicholas Colasanto posthumously received the Best Supporting Actor (Comedy) award. Of twelve Emmy nominations, in 1985 Perlman won for Outstanding Supporting Actress in a Comedy Series and "The Executive's Executioner" earned its sound crew the "Outstanding Live and Tape Sound Mixing and Sound Effects for a Series" award. Of nominees for 1984, Shelley Long won a Golden Globe in 1985 as Best Actress in a Musical-Comedy Series.

DVD release 
This season was released on DVD in Region 1 on May 25, 2004. Nate Meyers of Digitally Obsessed graded the video transfer a B+ (despite "print defects" in some episodes) and found the audio "proper", noting that the special features were (like other season DVDs) compilation clips of episodes, including a tribute to Nicholas Colasanto.

References

Notes

Ratings notes 
According to the Los Angeles Times, Nielsen ratings of 1984–85 were based on 84.9 million households.

External links 
 Production order of Cheers (season 3) at Copyright Catalog
 Click "Set Search Limits", select "Range", select "Motion Pictures" at "Item Type", type "1984" at left box and "1985" at right box, either hit "Enter" or click "Set Search Limits"
 Then, after above step, search by title, type "Cheers", and hit "Enter" or click "Begin search"
 Cheers, season 3 at Internet Movie Database
 Cheers, season 3 at TV Guide

3
1984 American television seasons
1985 American television seasons
Television episodes directed by James Burrows